Linda K. Epling Stadium is a baseball field in Beckley, West Virginia.   It opened in 2010. The field was built by the Epling family after it sold out its interests in the coal business. The stadium seats 2,500. It is used by the West Virginia Miners of the Prospect League and the WVU Tech Golden Bears. The facility has also been the home to select games of the Marshall University baseball team from 2010 to 2018, and was the home for select West Virginia University games in 2012 and 2013.

See also
 List of NCAA Division I baseball venues

References

Baseball venues in West Virginia
Buildings and structures in Raleigh County, West Virginia
Tourist attractions in Raleigh County, West Virginia
West Virginia Tech Golden Bears
College baseball venues in the United States
2010 establishments in West Virginia
Sports venues completed in 2010